Friday Night Knife Fight is the debut album by metalcore band Kid Gorgeous released in 2001 on Uprising Records.

Track listing 
"Love Song" – 3:21
"Paying the Butcher In Diamonds" – 3:12
"Kerosene Smile" – 2:44
"Friday Night Knife Fight"  – 1:27
"The Frank Sinatra Blues" – 3:19
"Because the Ceiling Was Too Low" – 2:38
"Feeding Off the Misfortune of Others" – 3:16
"Blades" – 1:56
"And the Headlines Muttered Dirt" – 2:26
"I Hate Kid Gorgeous" – 1:53

Personnel 
John McCarthy - Guitar
Erik Boccio -   Vocals
Stephen Micciche - Guitar
Jesse Muscato - Drums
Justin Cuviello - Bass

References

2001 debut albums
Kid Gorgeous albums
Albums recorded at Watchmen Recording Studios